A Markush structure is a representation of chemical structure used to indicate a group of related chemical compounds.  They are commonly used in chemistry texts and in patent claims.  Markush structures are depicted with multiple independently variable groups, such as R groups in which a side chain can have varying structure.  This more general depiction of the molecule, versus detailing every atom in the molecule, is used to protect intellectual property. The company which applies for a patent makes a general claim for the usage of the molecule without revealing to their competitors the exact molecule for which they are declaring a useful application.

History 

Markush structures are named after Eugene A. Markush, founder of the Pharma Chemical Corporation in New Jersey. He was involved in a legal case that set a precedent for generic chemical structure patent filing. The patent filing was US Application 611,637, filed January 9, 1923. Markush was awarded a patent from the US Patent Office for “Pyrazolone Dye and Process of Making the Same” on August 26, 1924.

Use in patents 

In describing a chemical, a Markush structure allows the patent-holder to list several active/effective structural formulas.

United States 
Patent applicants in the United States are required to reveal their best known embodiment implementing their invention. However, the "best mode" requirement can no longer be used as a basis for invalidity or denying patentability. Separately, patent claims in the United States can be rejected or invalidated as indefinite for failing to particularly point out and distinctly claim the subject matter of the invention.

See also
 Molecule editor
 Chemical file format
 List of patent claim types#Markush

References

External links
 

Chemical structures